Schumannella is a Gram-positive, anaerobic, rod-shaped and non-motile genus of bacteria from the family of Microbacteriaceae. Schumannella is named after the German microbiologist P. Schumann. Schumannella luteola has been isolated from lichen from Tokyo in Japan.

References
 

Microbacteriaceae
Bacteria genera
Monotypic bacteria genera